Windermere Secondary School is a public secondary school located on the east side of Vancouver, British Columbia, Canada.

Current

Leadership program 
The school offers a program called the Leadership Program, where students develop leadership skills, are involved in the community, and set goals for the future.

The leadership program focuses on academics, health and fitness, volunteering, and outdoor education. In academics, throughout grades 8 to 12, there is a focus on reading, where students read a variety of books as part of the Social Studies curriculum. The program also teaches about the environment, as well as social and personal responsibility.

The health and fitness aspect of the program focuses on personal diet and health choices. Outdoor activities are regarded as one of the most important parts of the program; students train for various outdoor activities in preparation for camping trips once a year throughout grades 8 to 12. Activities during camping trips include hiking, biking, rock climbing, kayaking, and winter sports. Students will also have a chance to take a course for CPR in grades 9 and 12.

Volunteering is a large part of the program, as there are plenty of opportunities where students can assist and engage with the community. In Grade 11, students take what they have learned and apply them via collaborating with neighboring elementary schools, to develop projects regarding sustainability. Students in Grade 11 also organize the school's Climate Change Conference in the fall and the annual Earth Day Parade & Festival in April. The parade runs along Commercial Drive in Vancouver and has attracted thousands of participants. Environmental activists such as David Suzuki and Grand Chief Stewart Phillip have supported and spoken at the festival. Environmental advocacy groups such as Wilderness Committee have also supported the Earth Day Celebration in various ways.

Mini-school 

A second mini-school, the Athena Arts program, was added to Windermere in 2008. The program previously ran through Grades 8 to 12; however, in 2010 it was changed to run for Grades 8 to 10 only.

Since the early 2000s, Windermere has prepared a "Link Crew program" every summer. The goal of this program is to design new grade 8 students for the secondary school under the leadership of grade 11 and 12 students.

Notable alumni 
 Raymond Louie — Canadian politician and Vancouver City Councillor (2002–2018)

References 

High schools in Vancouver
Educational institutions established in 1961
1961 establishments in British Columbia